Ted Andersson (born 20 December 1972) is a former Swedish bandy player who most recently played for Västerås SK as a midfielder.  Ted was a youth product of Västanfors IF and was spotted during his first season by Västerås SK where he has stayed since.  Ted has played for the Swedish national bandy team.

External links

Swedish bandy players
Living people
1972 births
Västanfors IF players
Västerås SK Bandy players